Beyond the Infinite is the second EP by Swedish melodic death metal band Soilwork. It was released by Victor Entertainment on September 24, 2014. It contains five unreleased tracks from The Living Infinite sessions and was mixed and mastered at Fascination Street by Johan Örnborg. This release is for Asia only and no plans have been made to release the EP in current form outside of Asia. The tracks have since been included in the 2016 compilation album Death Resonance.

Track listing

Credits 
Writing, performance and production credits are adapted from the album liner notes.

Personnel 
Soilwork
 Björn Strid – vocals
 David Andersson – guitar
 Sylvain Coudret – guitar
 Ola Flink – bass
 Sven Karlsson – keyboards
 Dirk Verbeuren – drums

Production
 Soilwork – production
 Jens Bogren – production
 Johan Örnborg – production assistance, mixing, mastering
 Linus Corneliusson and Donal Fitsberg  – production assistance

Artwork and design
 Mircea Gabriel Eftemie (Mnemic) – album cover
 Hannah Verbeuren – photography

Studios 
 Fascination Street Recordings, Örebro, Sweden – recording, mixing, mastering

References

External links 
 Beyond the Infinite at Soilwork's official website

2014 EPs
Soilwork albums